

Peerage of England

|rowspan="2"|Duke of Cornwall (1337)||Prince James Francis Edward||1688||1702||Attainted, whereby all his honours became forfeited
|-
|none||1702||1714||
|-
|rowspan="2"|Duke of Norfolk (1483)||Henry Howard, 7th Duke of Norfolk||1684||1701||Died
|-
|Thomas Howard, 8th Duke of Norfolk||1701||1732||
|-
|Duke of Somerset (1547)||Charles Seymour, 6th Duke of Somerset||1678||1748||
|-
|Duke of Cleveland (1670)||Barbara Palmer, 1st Duchess of Cleveland||1670||1709||
|-
|Duke of Portsmouth (1673)||Louise de Kérouaille, Duchess of Portsmouth||1673||1734||
|-
|Duke of Richmond (1675)||Charles Lennox, 1st Duke of Richmond||1675||1723||
|-
|Duke of Southampton (1675)||Charles Fitzroy, 1st Duke of Southampton||1675||1730||
|-
|Duke of Grafton (1675)||Charles FitzRoy, 2nd Duke of Grafton||1690||1757||
|-
|Duke of Ormonde (1682)||James Butler, 1st Duke of Ormonde||1682||1715||
|-
|rowspan="2"|Duke of Beaufort (1682)||Henry Somerset, 1st Duke of Beaufort||1682||1700||Died
|-
|Henry Somerset, 2nd Duke of Beaufort||1700||1714||
|-
|Duke of Northumberland (1683)||George FitzRoy, 1st Duke of Northumberland||1683||1716||
|-
|Duke of St Albans (1684)||Charles Beauclerk, 1st Duke of St Albans||1684||1726||
|-
|Duke of Cumberland (1689)||Prince George, Duke of Cumberland||1689||1708||
|-
|Duke of Bolton (1689)||Charles Paulet, 2nd Duke of Bolton||1699||1722||
|-
|Duke of Schomberg (1689)||Meinhardt Schomberg, 3rd Duke of Schomberg||1693||1719||
|-
|Duke of Shrewsbury (1694)||Charles Talbot, 1st Duke of Shrewsbury||1694||1718||
|-
|Duke of Leeds (1694)||Thomas Osborne, 1st Duke of Leeds||1694||1712||
|-
|rowspan="2"|Duke of Bedford (1694)||William Russell, 1st Duke of Bedford||1694||1700||Died
|-
|Wriothesley Russell, 2nd Duke of Bedford||1700||1711||
|-
|Duke of Devonshire (1694)||William Cavendish, 1st Duke of Devonshire||1694||1707||
|-
|Duke of Newcastle upon Tyne (1694)||John Holles, 1st Duke of Newcastle-upon-Tyne||1694||1711||
|-
|Duke of Marlborough (1702)||John Churchill, 1st Duke of Marlborough||1702||1722||New creation
|-
|Duke of Buckingham and Normanby (1703)||John Sheffield, 1st Duke of Buckingham and Normanby||1703||1721||New creation for the 1st Marquess of Normanby
|-
|Duke of Rutland (1703)||John Manners, 1st Duke of Rutland||1703||1711||New creation
|-
|Duke of Montagu (1705)||Ralph Montagu, 1st Duke of Montagu||1705||1709||New creation
|-
|Duke of Cambridge (1706)||Prince George, Duke of Cambridge||1706||1727||New creation
|-
|Marquess of Halifax (1682)||William Savile, 2nd Marquess of Halifax||1695||1700||Died, title extinct
|-
|Marquess of Powis (1687)||William Herbert, 2nd Marquess of Powis||1696||1745||
|-
|Marquess of Kent (1706)||Henry Grey, 1st Marquess of Kent||1706||1740||New creation
|-
|Marquess of Lindsey (1706)||Robert Bertie, 1st Marquess of Lindsey||1706||1723||New creation
|-
|Marquess of Dorchester (1706)||Evelyn Pierrepont, 1st Marquess of Dorchester||1706||1726||New creation
|-
|Earl of Oxford (1142)||Aubrey de Vere, 20th Earl of Oxford||1632||1703||Died, 
|-
|rowspan="2"|Earl of Kent (1465)||Anthony Grey, 11th Earl of Kent||1651||1702||Died
|-
|Henry Grey, 12th Earl of Kent||1702||1740||Created Marquess of Kent in 1706, see above
|-
|rowspan="2"|Earl of Derby (1485)||William Stanley, 9th Earl of Derby||1672||1702||Died
|-
|James Stanley, 10th Earl of Derby||1702||1736||
|-
|Earl of Rutland (1525)||John Manners, 9th Earl of Rutlan||1679||1711||Created Duke of Rutland, see above
|-
|rowspan="3"|Earl of Huntingdon (1529)||Theophilus Hastings, 7th Earl of Huntingdon||1656||1701||Died
|-
|George Hastings, 8th Earl of Huntingdon||1701||1705||Died
|-
|Theophilus Hastings, 9th Earl of Huntingdon||1705||1746||
|-
|Earl of Pembroke (1551)||Thomas Herbert, 8th Earl of Pembroke||1683||1733||
|-
|rowspan="2"|Earl of Devon (1553)||William Courtenay, de jure 5th Earl of Devon||1638||1702||Died
|-
|William Courtenay, de jure 6th Earl of Devon||1702||1735||
|-
|Earl of Lincoln (1572)||Henry Clinton, 7th Earl of Lincoln||1693||1728||
|-
|Earl of Suffolk (1603)||Henry Howard, 5th Earl of Suffolk||1691||1709||
|-
|rowspan="2"|Earl of Dorset (1604)||Charles Sackville, 6th Earl of Dorset||1677||1706||Died
|-
|Lionel Sackville, 7th Earl of Dorset||1706||1765||
|-
|rowspan="2"|Earl of Exeter (1605)||John Cecil, 5th Earl of Exeter||1678||1700||Died
|-
|John Cecil, 6th Earl of Exeter||1700||1721||
|-
|Earl of Salisbury (1605)||James Cecil, 5th Earl of Salisbury||1694||1728||
|-
|rowspan="2"|Earl of Bridgewater (1617)||John Egerton, 3rd Earl of Bridgewater||1686||1701||
|-
|Scroop Egerton, 4th Earl of Bridgewater||1701||1744||
|-
|Earl of Northampton (1618)||George Compton, 4th Earl of Northampton||1681||1727||
|-
|rowspan="3"|Earl of Leicester (1618)||Robert Sidney, 4th Earl of Leicester||1698||1702||Died
|-
|Philip Sidney, 5th Earl of Leicester||1702||1705||
|-
|John Sidney, 6th Earl of Leicester||1705||1737||
|-
|rowspan="2"|Earl of Warwick (1618)||Edward Rich, 6th Earl of Warwick||1675||1701||Died
|-
|Edward Rich, 7th Earl of Warwick||1702||1721||
|-
|Earl of Denbigh (1622)||Basil Feilding, 4th Earl of Denbigh||1685||1717||
|-
|Earl of Bolingbroke (1624)||Paulet St John, 3rd Earl of Bolingbroke||1688||1711||
|-
|Earl of Westmorland (1624)||Thomas Fane, 6th Earl of Westmorland||1699||1736||
|-
|Earl of Manchester (1626)||Charles Montagu, 4th Earl of Manchester||1683||1722||
|-
|rowspan="2"|Earl of Berkshire (1626)||Thomas Howard, 3rd Earl of Berkshire||1679||1706||Died
|-
|Henry Howard, 4th Earl of Berkshire||1706||1757||
|-
|Earl Rivers (1626)||Richard Savage, 4th Earl Rivers||1694||1712||
|-
|rowspan="2"|Earl of Lindsey (1626)||Robert Bertie, 3rd Earl of Lindsey||1666||1701||Died
|-
|Robert Bertie, 4th Earl of Lindsey||1701||1723||Created Marquess of Lindsey, see above
|-
|Earl of Peterborough (1628)||Charles Mordaunt, 3rd Earl of Peterborough||1697||1735||
|-
|Earl of Stamford (1628)||Thomas Grey, 2nd Earl of Stamford||1673||1720||
|-
|Earl of Winchilsea (1628)||Charles Finch, 4th Earl of Winchilsea||1689||1712||
|-
|Earl of Kingston-upon-Hull (1628)||Evelyn Pierrepont, 5th Earl of Kingston-upon-Hull||1690||1726||Created Marquess of Dorchester, see above
|-
|Earl of Carnarvon (1628)||Charles Dormer, 2nd Earl of Carnarvon||1643||1709||
|-
|Earl of Chesterfield (1628)||Philip Stanhope, 2nd Earl of Chesterfield||1656||1714||
|-
|Earl of Thanet (1628)||Thomas Tufton, 6th Earl of Thanet||1684||1729||
|-
|rowspan="2"|Earl of Sunderland (1643)||Robert Spencer, 2nd Earl of Sunderland||1643||1702||Died
|-
|Charles Spencer, 3rd Earl of Sunderland||1702||1722||
|-
|Earl of Scarsdale (1645)||Robert Leke, 3rd Earl of Scarsdale||1681||1707||
|-
|Earl of Sandwich (1660)||Edward Montagu, 3rd Earl of Sandwich||1688||1729||
|-
|rowspan="2"|Earl of Anglesey (1661)||James Annesley, 3rd Earl of Anglesey||1690||1702||Died
|-
|John Annesley, 4th Earl of Anglesey||1702||1710||
|-
|rowspan="3"|Earl of Bath (1661)||John Granville, 1st Earl of Bath||1661||1701||Died
|-
|Charles Granville, 2nd Earl of Bath||1701||1701||Died
|-
|William Granville, 3rd Earl of Bath||1701||1711||
|-
|rowspan="2"|Earl of Cardigan (1661)||Robert Brudenell, 2nd Earl of Cardigan||1663||1703||Died
|-
|George Brudenell, 3rd Earl of Cardigan||1703||1732||
|-
|Earl of Clarendon (1661)||Henry Hyde, 2nd Earl of Clarendon||1674||1709||
|-
|Earl of Essex (1661)||Algernon Capell, 2nd Earl of Essex||1683||1710||
|-
|Earl of Carlisle (1661)||Charles Howard, 3rd Earl of Carlisle||1692||1738||
|-
|Earl of Ailesbury (1664)||Thomas Bruce, 2nd Earl of Ailesbury||1685||1741||Earl of Elgin in the Peerage of Scotland
|-
|rowspan="2"|Earl of Burlington (1664)||Charles Boyle, 2nd Earl of Burlington||1698||1704||Earl of Cork in the Peerage of Ireland; died
|-
|Richard Boyle, 3rd Earl of Burlington||1704||1753||Earl of Cork in the Peerage of Ireland
|-
|Earl of Arlington (1672)||Isabella Fitzroy, 2nd Countess of Arlington||1685||1723||
|-
|Earl of Shaftesbury (1672)||Anthony Ashley-Cooper, 3rd Earl of Shaftesbury||1699||1713||
|-
|Earl of Lichfield (1674)||Edward Lee, 1st Earl of Lichfield||1674||1716||
|-
|Earl of Sussex (1674)||Thomas Lennard, 1st Earl of Sussex||1674||1715||
|-
|Earl of Feversham (1676)||Louis de Duras, 2nd Earl of Feversham||1677||1709||
|-
|Earl of Radnor (1679)||Charles Robartes, 2nd Earl of Radnor||1685||1723||
|-
|rowspan="2"|Earl of Macclesfield (1679)||Charles Gerard, 2nd Earl of Macclesfield||1695||1701||Died
|-
|Fitton Gerard, 3rd Earl of Macclesfield||1701||1702||Died, title extinct
|-
|Earl of Yarmouth (1679)||William Paston, 2nd Earl of Yarmouth||1683||1732||
|-
|Earl of Berkeley (1679)||Charles Berkeley, 2nd Earl of Berkeley||1698||1710||
|-
|Earl of Nottingham (1681)||Daniel Finch, 2nd Earl of Nottingham||1682||1730||
|-
|Earl of Rochester (1682)||Laurence Hyde, 1st Earl of Rochester||1682||1711||
|-
|Earl of Abingdon (1682)||Montagu Venables-Bertie, 2nd Earl of Abingdon||1699||1743||
|-
|Earl of Gainsborough (1682)||Baptist Noel, 3rd Earl of Gainsborough||1690||1714||
|-
|Earl of Plymouth (1682)||Other Windsor, 2nd Earl of Plymouth||1687||1727||
|-
|Earl of Holderness (1682)||Robert Darcy, 3rd Earl of Holderness||1692||1721||
|-
|Earl of Dorchester (1686)||Catherine Sedley, Countess of Dorchester||1686||1717||
|-
|rowspan="2"|Earl of Derwentwater (1688)||Edward Radclyffe, 2nd Earl of Derwentwater||1697||1705||
|-
|James Radclyffe, 3rd Earl of Derwentwater||1705||1716||
|-
|Earl of Stafford (1688)||Henry Stafford Howard, 1st Earl of Stafford||1688||1719||
|-
|Earl of Fauconberg (1689)||Thomas Belasyse, 1st Earl Fauconberg||1689||1700||Died, title extinct; Viscountcy Fauconberg succeeded by nephew, see below
|-
|Earl of Marlborough (1689)||John Churchill, 1st Earl of Marlborough||1689||1722||Created Duke of Marlborough, see above
|-
|Earl of Montagu (1689)||Ralph Montagu, 1st Earl of Montagu||1689||1709||Created Duke of Montagu, see above
|-
|Earl of Portland (1689)||William Bentinck, 1st Earl of Portland||1689||1709||
|-
|Earl of Torrington (1689)||Arthur Herbert, 1st Earl of Torrington||1689||1716||
|-
|Earl of Warrington (1690)||George Booth, 2nd Earl of Warrington||1694||1758||
|-
|Earl of Scarbrough (1690)||Richard Lumley, 1st Earl of Scarbrough||1721||1694||
|-
|Earl of Bradford (1694)||Francis Newport, 1st Earl of Bradford||1694||1708||
|-
|Earl of Romney (1694)||Henry Sydney, 1st Earl of Romney||1694||1704||Died, title extinct
|-
|Earl of Rochford (1695)||William Nassau de Zuylestein, 1st Earl of Rochford||1695||1708||
|-
|Earl of Tankerville (1695)||Ford Grey, 1st Earl of Tankerville||1695||1701||Died, title extinct
|-
|Earl of Albemarle (1697)||Arnold van Keppel, 1st Earl of Albemarle||1697||1718||
|-
|Earl of Coventry (1697)||Thomas Coventry, 2nd Earl of Coventry||1699||1710||
|-
|Earl of Orford (1697)||Edward Russell, 1st Earl of Orford||1697||1727||
|-
|Earl of Jersey (1697)||Edward Villiers, 1st Earl of Jersey||1697||1711||
|-
|Earl of Grantham (1698)||Henry de Nassau d'Auverquerque, 1st Earl of Grantham||1698||1754||
|-
|Earl of Wharton (1706)||Thomas Wharton, 1st Earl of Wharton||1706||1715||New creation
|-
|Earl Poulett (1706)||John Poulett, 1st Earl Poulett||1706||1743||New creation
|-
|Earl of Godolphin (1706)||Sidney Godolphin, 1st Earl of Godolphin||1706||1712||New creation
|-
|Earl of Cholmondeley (1706)||Hugh Cholmondeley, 1st Earl of Cholmondeley||1706||1725||New creation
|-
|Earl of Bindon (1706)||Henry Howard, 1st Earl of Bindon||1706||1718||New creation
|-
|rowspan="2"|Viscount Hereford (1550)||Edward Devereux, 8th Viscount Hereford||1683||1700||Died
|-
|Price Devereux, 9th Viscount Hereford||1700||1740||
|-
|Viscount Montagu (1554)||Francis Browne, 4th Viscount Montagu||1682||1708||
|-
|Viscount Saye and Sele (1624)||Nathaniel Fiennes, 4th Viscount Saye and Sele||1698||1710||
|-
|Viscount Fauconberg (1643)||Thomas Belasyse, 3rd Viscount Fauconberg||1700||1718||
|-
|rowspan="2"|Viscount Hatton (1682)||Christopher Hatton, 1st Viscount Hatton||1682||1706||Died
|-
|William Seton Hatton, 2nd Viscount Hatton||1706||1760||
|-
|Viscount Townshend (1682)||Charles Townshend, 2nd Viscount Townshend||1687||1738||
|-
|Viscount Weymouth (1682)||Thomas Thynne, 1st Viscount Weymouth||1682||1714||
|-
|rowspan="2"|Viscount de Longueville (1690)||Henry Yelverton, 1st Viscount Longueville||1690||1704||Died
|-
|Talbot Yelverton, 2nd Viscount de Longueville||1704||1731||
|-
|rowspan="2"|Viscount Lonsdale (1690)||John Lowther, 1st Viscount Lonsdale||1699||1700||Died
|-
|Richard Lowther, 2nd Viscount Lonsdale||1700||1713||
|-
|Baron FitzWalter (1295)||Charles Mildmay, 18th Baron FitzWalter||1679||1728||
|- 
|Baron Ferrers of Chartley (1299)||Robert Shirley, 14th Baron Ferrers of Chartley||1677||1717||
|- 
|rowspan="3"|Baron Dudley (1440)||Edward Ward, 7th Baron Dudley||1697||1701||Died
|- 
|Edward Ward, 8th Baron Dudley||1701||1704||Died
|- 
|Edward Ward, 9th Baron Dudley||1704||1731||
|- 
|Baron Stourton (1448)||Edward Stourton, 13th Baron Stourton||1685||1720||
|- 
|Baron Willoughby de Broke (1491)||Richard Verney, 11th Baron Willoughby de Broke||1683||1711||
|- 
|Baron Wentworth (1529)||Martha Johnson, 8th Baroness Wentworth||1697||1745||
|-
|Baron Mordaunt (1532)||Mary Howard, 7th Baroness Mordaunt||1697||1705||Died, Barony succeeded by the Earl of Peterborough, see above
|-
|Baron Eure (1544)||Ralph Eure, 7th Baron Eure||1672||1707||Died, title extinct
|-
|Baron Wharton (1545)||Thomas Wharton, 5th Baron Wharton||1695||1715||Created Earl of Wharton in 1706, see above
|-
|Baron Willoughby of Parham (1547)||Henry Willoughby, de jure 12th Baron Willoughby of Parham||1685||1722||
|-
|Baron Paget (1552)||William Paget, 6th Baron Paget||1678||1713||
|-
|Baron North (1554)||William North, 6th Baron North||1691||1734||
|-
|Baron Howard of Effingham (1554)||Thomas Howard, 6th Baron Howard of Effingham||1695||1725||
|-
|Baron Chandos (1554)||James Brydges, 8th Baron Chandos||1676||1714||
|-
|rowspan="2"|Baron Hunsdon (1559)||Robert Carey, 7th Baron Hunsdon||1692||1702||Died
|-
|William Ferdinand Carey, 8th Baron Hunsdon||1702||1765||
|-
|Baron De La Warr (1570)||John West, 6th Baron De La Warr||1687||1723||
|-
|rowspan="2"|Baron Gerard (1603)||Charles Gerard, 6th Baron Gerard||1684||1707||Died
|-
|Philip Gerard, 7th Baron Gerard||1707||1733||
|-
|rowspan="2"|Baron Petre (1603)||Thomas Petre, 6th Baron Petre||1684||1706||Died
|-
|Robert Petre, 7th Baron Petre||1706||1713||
|-
|Baron Arundell of Wardour (1605)||Thomas Arundell, 4th Baron Arundell of Wardour||1694||1712||
|-
|rowspan="3"|Baron Clifton (1608)||Katherine O'Brien, 7th Baroness Clifton||1672||1702||Died
|-
|Katherine Hyde, 8th Baroness Clifton||1702||1706||Died
|-
|Edward Hyde, 9th Baron Clifton||1706||1713||
|-
|Baron Teynham (1616)||Henry Roper, 8th Baron Teynham||1699||1723||
|-
|Baron Brooke (1621)||Fulke Greville, 5th Baron Brooke||1677||1710||
|-
|Baron Grey of Warke (1624)||Ralph Grey, 4th Baron Grey of Werke||1701||1706||Title previously held by the Earl of Tankerville; died, title extinct
|-
|Baron Craven (1627)||William Craven, 2nd Baron Craven||1697||1711||
|-
|Baron Lovelace (1627)||John Lovelace, 4th Baron Lovelace||1693||1709||
|-
|Baron Poulett (1627)||John Poulett, 4th Baron Poulett||1679||1743||Created Earl Poulett, see above
|-
|Baron Maynard (1628)||Banastre Maynard, 3rd Baron Maynard||1699||1718||
|-
|Baron Mohun of Okehampton (1628)||Charles Mohun, 4th Baron Mohun of Okehampton||1677||1712||
|-
|Baron Herbert of Chirbury (1641)||Thomas Wentworth, 3rd Baron Raby||1695||1739||
|-
|Baron Leigh (1643)||Thomas Leigh, 2nd Baron Leigh||1672||1710||
|-
|rowspan="2"|Baron Jermyn (1643)||Thomas Jermyn, 2nd Baron Jermyn||1684||1703||Died
|-
|Henry Jermyn, 3rd Baron Jermyn||1703||1708||
|-
|Baron Byron (1643)||William Byron, 4th Baron Byron||1695||1736||
|-
|Baron Widdrington (1643)||William Widdrington, 4th Baron Widdrington||1695||1716||
|-
|Baron Colepeper (1644)||John Colepeper, 3rd Baron of Colepeper||1689||1719||
|-
|Baron Lucas of Shenfield (1645)||Robert Lucas, 3rd Baron Lucas of Shenfield||1688||1705||Died, title extinct
|-
|Baron Rockingham (1645)||Lewis Watson, 3rd Baron Rockingham||1689||1724||
|-
|Baron Lexinton (1645)||Robert Sutton, 2nd Baron Lexinton||1668||1723||
|-
|rowspan="2"|Baron Langdale (1658)||Marmaduke Langdale, 2nd Baron Langdale||1661||1703||Died
|-
|Marmaduke Langdale, 3rd Baron Langdale||1703||1718||
|-
|Baron Berkeley of Stratton (1658)||William Berkeley, 4th Baron Berkeley of Stratton||1697||1741||
|-
|Baron Cornwallis (1661)||Charles Cornwallis, 4th Baron Cornwallis||1698||1722||
|-
|Baron Crew (1661)||Nathaniel Crew, 3rd Baron Crew||1697||1721||
|-
|Baron Lucas of Crudwell (1663)||Mary Grey, 1st Baroness Lucas||1663||1702||Died; Title succeeded by the Earl of Kent, see above
|-
|rowspan="2"|Baron Arundell of Trerice (1664)||John Arundell, 3rd Baron Arundell of Trerice||1698||1706||Died
|-
|John Arundell, 4th Baron Arundell of Trerice||1706||1768||
|-
|Baron Clifford of Chudleigh (1672)||Hugh Clifford, 2nd Baron Clifford of Chudleigh||1673||1730||
|-
|Baron Belasyse of Osgodby (1674)||Susan Belasyse, Baroness Belasyse||1674||1713||
|-
|Baron Willoughby of Parham (1680)||Hugh Willoughby, 12th Baron Willoughby of Parham||1692||1712||
|-
|Baron Carteret (1681)||John Carteret, 2nd Baron Carteret||1695||1763||
|-
|Baron Ossulston (1682)||Charles Bennet, 2nd Baron Ossulston||1695||1722||
|-
|Baron Dartmouth (1682)||William Legge, 2nd Baron Dartmouth||1691||1750||
|-
|Baron Stawell (1683)||William Stawell, 3rd Baron Stawell||1692||1742||
|-
|Baron Guilford (1683)||Francis North, 2nd Baron Guilford||1685||1729||
|-
|Baron Godolphin (1684)||Sidney Godolphin, 1st Baron Godolphin||1684||1712||Created Earl of Godolphin, see above
|-
|Baron Jeffreys (1685)||John Jeffreys, 2nd Baron Jeffreys||1689||1702||Died, title extinct
|-
|Baron Waldegrave (1686)||James Waldegrave, 2nd Baron Waldegrave||1689||1741||
|-
|Baron Griffin (1688)||Edward Griffin, 1st Baron Griffin||1688||1710||
|-
|Baron Ashburnham (1689)||John Ashburnham, 1st Baron Ashburnham||1689||1710||
|-
|Baron Cholmondeley (1689)||Hugh Cholmondeley, 1st Baron Cholmondeley||1689||1725||Created Earl of Cholmondeley, see above
|-
|Baron Leominster (1692)||William Fermor, 1st Baron Leominster||1692||1711||
|-
|Baron Herbert of Chirbury (1694)||Henry Herbert, 1st Baron Herbert of Chirbury||1694||1709||
|-
|Baron Abergavenny (1695)||George Nevill, 13th Baron Bergavenny||1695||1721||
|-
|Baron Haversham (1696)||John Thompson, 1st Baron Haversham||1696||1710||
|-
|Baron Somers (1697)||John Somers, 1st Baron Somers||1697||1716||
|-
|Baron Barnard (1698)||Christopher Vane, 1st Baron Barnard||1698||1723||
|-
|Baron Halifax (1700)||Charles Montagu, 1st Baron Halifax||1700||1715||New creation
|-
|Baron Granville of Potheridge (1703)||John Granville, 1st Baron Granville of Potheridge||1703||1707||New creation
|-
|Baron Guernsey (1703)||Heneage Finch, 1st Baron Guernsey||1703||1719||New creation
|-
|Baron Gower (1703)||John Leveson-Gower, 1st Baron Gower||1703||1709||New creation
|-
|Baron Conway (1703)||Francis Seymour-Conway, 1st Baron Conway||1703||1732||New creation
|-
|Baron Hervey (1703)||John Hervey, 1st Baron Hervey||1703||1751||New creation
|-
|Baron Cowper (1706)||William Cowper, 1st Baron Cowper||1706||1723||New creation
|-
|Baron Pelham of Stanmer (1706)||Thomas Pelham, 1st Baron Pelham||1706||1712||New creation
|-
|}

Peerage of Scotland

|Duke of Rothesay (1398)||James Stuart, Duke of Rothesay||1688||1702||Attainted
|-
|Duke of Hamilton (1643)||James Hamilton, 4th Duke of Hamilton||1698||1712||
|-
|Duke of Buccleuch (1663)||Anne Scott, 1st Duchess of Buccleuch||1663||1732||
|-
|Duke of Lennox (1675)||Charles Lennox, 1st Duke of Lennox||1675||1723||
|-
|Duke of Queensberry (1684)||James Douglas, 2nd Duke of Queensberry||1695||1711||
|-
|Duke of Gordon (1684)||George Gordon, 1st Duke of Gordon||1684||1716||
|-
|rowspan=2|Duke of Argyll (1701)||Archibald Campbell, 1st Duke of Argyll||1701||1703||New creation; died
|-
|John Campbell, 2nd Duke of Argyll||1703||1743||
|-
|Duke of Atholl (1703)||John Murray, 1st Duke of Atholl||1703||1724||New creation
|-
|Duke of Douglas (1703)||Archibald Douglas, 1st Duke of Douglas||1703||1761||New creation
|-
|Duke of Montrose (1707)||James Graham, 1st Duke of Montrose||1707||1742||New creation
|-
|Duke of Roxburghe (1707)||John Ker, 1st Duke of Roxburghe||1707||1741||New creation
|-
|rowspan=2|Marquess of Douglas (1633)||James Douglas, 2nd Marquess of Douglas||1660||1700||Died
|-
|Archibald Douglas, 3rd Marquess of Douglas||1660||1700||Created Duke of Douglas, see above
|-
|Marquess of Montrose (1644)||James Graham, 4th Marquess of Montrose||1684||1742||Created Duke of Montrose, see above
|-
|rowspan=2|Marquess of Atholl (1676)||John Murray, 1st Marquess of Atholl||1676||1703||Died
|-
|John Murray, 2nd Marquess of Atholl||1676||1703||Created Duke of Atholl, see above
|-
|Marquess of Tweeddale (1694)||John Hay, 2nd Marquess of Tweeddale||1697||1713||
|-
|rowspan=2|Marquess of Lothian (1701)||Robert Kerr, 1st Marquess of Lothian||1701||1703||New creation; died
|-
|William Kerr, 2nd Marquess of Lothian||1703||1722||
|-
|Marquess of Annandale (1701)||William Johnstone, 1st Marquess of Annandale||1701||1721||New creation
|-
|Earl of Argyll (1457)||Archibald Campbell, 10th Earl of Argyll||1685||1703||Created Duke of Argyll, see above
|-
|Earl of Crawford (1398)||John Lindsay, 19th Earl of Crawford||1698||1713||
|-
|rowspan=2|Earl of Erroll (1452)||John Hay, 12th Earl of Erroll||1674||1704||Died
|-
|Charles Hay, 13th Earl of Erroll||1704||1717||
|-
|Earl Marischal (1458)||William Keith, 9th Earl Marischal||1694||1712||
|-
|rowspan=2|Earl of Sutherland (1235)||George Gordon, 15th Earl of Sutherland||1679||1703||Died
|-
|John Gordon, 16th Earl of Sutherland||1703||1733||
|-
|Earl of Mar (1114)||John Erskine, Earl of Mar||1689||1732||
|-
|rowspan=2|Earl of Rothes (1458)||Margaret Leslie, 8th Countess of Rothes||1681||1700||Died
|-
|John Hamilton-Leslie, 9th Earl of Rothes||1700||1722||
|-
|Earl of Morton (1458)||James Douglas, 11th Earl of Morton||1686||1715||
|-
|rowspan=2|Earl of Glencairn (1488)||John Cunningham, 11th Earl of Glencairn||1670||1703||Died
|-
|William Cunningham, 12th Earl of Glencairn||1703||1734||
|-
|rowspan=2|Earl of Eglinton (1507)||Alexander Montgomerie, 8th Earl of Eglinton||1669||1701||Died
|-
|Alexander Montgomerie, 9th Earl of Eglinton||1701||1729||
|-
|rowspan=2|Earl of Cassilis (1509)||John Kennedy, 7th Earl of Cassilis||1668||1701||Died
|-
|John Kennedy, 8th Earl of Cassilis||1701||1759||
|-
|rowspan=2|Earl of Caithness (1455)||John Sinclair, 8th Earl of Caithness||1698||1705||
|-
|Alexander Sinclair, 9th Earl of Caithness||1705||1765||
|-
|Earl of Buchan (1469)||David Erskine, 9th Earl of Buchan||1695||1745||
|-
|rowspan=2|Earl of Moray (1562)||Alexander Stuart, 5th Earl of Moray||1653||1701||Died
|-
|Charles Stuart, 6th Earl of Moray||1701||1735||
|-
|Earl of Linlithgow (1600)||James Livingston, 5th Earl of Linlithgow||1695||1716||
|-
|rowspan=2|Earl of Winton (1600)||George Seton, 4th Earl of Winton||1650||1704||Died
|-
|George Seton, 5th Earl of Winton||1704||1716||
|-
|rowspan=2|Earl of Home (1605)||Charles Home, 6th Earl of Home||1687||1706||Died
|-
|Alexander Home, 7th Earl of Home||1706||1720||
|-
|Earl of Perth (1605)||James Drummond, 4th Earl of Perth||1675||1716||
|-
|Earl of Wigtown (1606)||John Fleming, 6th Earl of Wigtown||1681||1744||
|-
|rowspan=2|Earl of Abercorn (1606)||Charles Hamilton, 5th Earl of Abercorn||1691||1701||Died
|-
|James Hamilton, 6th Earl of Abercorn||1701||1734||
|-
|Earl of Strathmore and Kinghorne (1606)||John Lyon, 4th Earl of Strathmore and Kinghorne||1695||1712||
|-
|Earl of Roxburghe (1616)||John Ker, 5th Earl of Roxburghe||1696||1741||Create Duke of Roxburghe, see above
|-
|Earl of Kellie (1619)||Alexander Erskine, 4th Earl of Kellie||1677||1710||
|-
|Earl of Haddington (1619)||Thomas Hamilton, 6th Earl of Haddington||1685||1735||
|-
|Earl of Nithsdale (1620)||William Maxwell, 5th Earl of Nithsdale||1696||1716||
|-
|Earl of Galloway (1623)||James Stewart, 5th Earl of Galloway||1694||1746||
|-
|rowspan=2|Earl of Seaforth (1623)||Kenneth Mackenzie, 4th Earl of Seaforth||1678||1701||Died
|-
|William Mackenzie, 5th Earl of Seaforth||1701||1716||
|-
|Earl of Lauderdale (1624)||John Maitland, 5th Earl of Lauderdale||1695||1710||
|-
|Earl of Lauderdale (1624)||John Maitland, 5th Earl of Lauderdale||1695||1710||
|-
|Earl of Lothian (1631)||Robert Kerr, 2nd Earl of Lothian||1675||1703||Created Marquess of Lothian, see above
|-
|Earl of Loudoun (1633)||Hugh Campbell, 3rd Earl of Loudoun||1684||1731||
|-
|Earl of Kinnoull (1633)||William Hay, 6th Earl of Kinnoull||1687||1709||
|-
|Earl of Dumfries (1633)||Penelope Crichton, 4th Countess of Dumfries||1694||1742||
|-
|Earl of Stirling (1633)||Henry Alexander, 5th Earl of Stirling||1691||1739||
|-
|Earl of Elgin (1633)||Thomas Bruce, 3rd Earl of Elgin||1685||1741||
|-
|Earl of Southesk (1633)||James Carnegie, 5th Earl of Southesk||1699||1716||
|-
|Earl of Traquair (1633)||Charles Stewart, 4th Earl of Traquair||1673||1741||
|-
|rowspan=2|Earl of Wemyss (1633)||Margaret Wemyss, 3rd Countess of Wemyss||1679||1705||Died
|-
|David Wemyss, 4th Earl of Wemyss||1705||1720||
|-
|Earl of Dalhousie (1633)||William Ramsay, 5th Earl of Dalhousie||1696||1710||
|-
|Earl of Findlater (1638)||James Ogilvy, 3rd Earl of Findlater||1658||1711||
|-
|rowspan=2|Earl of Airlie (1639)||James Ogilvy, 2nd Earl of Airlie||1665||1703||Died
|-
|David Ogilvy, 3rd Earl of Airlie||1703||1717||
|-
|rowspan=2|Earl of Carnwath (1639)||John Dalzell, 4th Earl of Carnwath||1683||1702||Died
|-
|Robert Dalzell, 5th Earl of Carnwath||1683||1737||
|-
|Earl of Callendar (1641)||James Livingston, 4th Earl of Callendar||1692||1716||
|-
|Earl of Leven (1641)||David Leslie, 3rd Earl of Leven||1676||1728||
|-
|Earl of Dysart (1643)||Lionel Tollemache, 3rd Earl of Dysart||1698||1727||
|-
|Earl of Panmure (1646)||James Maule, 4th Earl of Panmure||1686||1716||
|-
|Earl of Selkirk (1646)||Charles Douglas, 2nd Earl of Selkirk||1694||1739||
|-
|Earl of Northesk (1647)||David Carnegie, 4th Earl of Northesk||1688||1729||
|-
|rowspan=3|Earl of Kincardine (1647)||Alexander Bruce, 3rd Earl of Kincardine||1680||1705||Died
|-
|Alexander Bruce, 4th Earl of Kincardine||1705||1706||Died
|-
|Robert Bruce, 5th Earl of Kincardine||1706||1718||
|-
|Earl of Balcarres (1651)||Colin Lindsay, 3rd Earl of Balcarres||1662||1722||
|-
|rowspan=2|Earl of Aboyne (1660)||Charles Gordon, 2nd Earl of Aboyne||1681||1702||Died
|-
|John Gordon, 3rd Earl of Aboyne||1702||1732||
|-
|Earl of Newburgh (1660)||Charles Livingston, 2nd Earl of Newburgh||1670||1755||
|-
|Earl of Annandale and Hartfell (1661)||William Johnstone, 2nd Earl of Annandale and Hartfell||1672||1721||Created Marquess of Annandale, see above
|-
|Earl of Kilmarnock (1661)||William Boyd, 3rd Earl of Kilmarnock||1692||1717||
|-
|Earl of Forfar (1661)||Archibald Douglas, 1st Earl of Forfar||1661||1712||
|-
|rowspan=2|Earl of Dundonald (1669)||William Cochrane, 3rd Earl of Dundonald||1690||1705||Died
|-
|John Cochrane, 4th Earl of Dundonald||1705||1720||
|-
|Earl of Dumbarton (1675)||George Douglas, 2nd Earl of Dumbarton||1692||1749||
|-
|Earl of Kintore (1677)||John Keith, 1st Earl of Kintore||1677||1714||
|-
|Earl of Breadalbane and Holland (1677)||John Campbell, 1st Earl of Breadalbane and Holland||1677||1717||
|-
|Earl of Aberdeen (1682)||George Gordon, 1st Earl of Aberdeen||1682||1720||
|-
|Earl of Dunmore (1686)||Charles Murray, 1st Earl of Dunmore||1686||1710||
|-
|Earl of Melville (1690)||George Melville, 1st Earl of Melville||1690||1707||
|-
|Earl of Orkney (1696)||George Hamilton, 1st Earl of Orkney||1696||1737||
|-
|Earl of Tullibardine (1696)||John Murray, 1st Earl of Tullibardine||1696||1724||Created Duke of Atholl, see above
|-
|Earl of Ruglen (1697)||John Hamilton, 1st Earl of Ruglen||1697||1744||
|-
|rowspan=2|Earl of March (1697)||William Douglas, 1st Earl of March||1697||1705||Died
|-
|William Douglas, 2nd Earl of March||1705||1731||
|-
|Earl of Marchmont (1697)||Patrick Hume, 1st Earl of Marchmont||1697||1724||
|-
|Earl of Seafield (1701)||James Ogilvy, 1st Earl of Seafield||1701||1730||New creation
|-
|Earl of Hyndford (1701)||John Carmichael, 1st Earl of Hyndford||1701||1710||New creation
|-
|Earl of Cromartie (1703)||George Mackenzie, 1st Earl of Cromartie||1703||1714||New creation
|-
|rowspan=2|Earl of Stair (1703)||John Dalrymple, 1st Earl of Stair||1703||1707||New creation; died
|-
|John Dalrymple, 2nd Earl of Stair||1707||1747||
|-
|Earl of Rosebery (1703)||Archibald Primrose, 1st Earl of Rosebery||1703||1723||New creation, also created Viscount of Rosebery in 1700
|-
|Earl of Glasgow (1703)||David Boyle, 1st Earl of Glasgow||1703||1733||New creation
|-
|Earl of Portmore (1703)||David Colyear, 1st Earl of Portmore||1703||1730||New creation
|-
|Earl of Bute (1703)||James Stuart, 1st Earl of Bute||1703||1710||New creation
|-
|Earl of Hopetoun (1703)||Charles Hope, 1st Earl of Hopetoun||1703||1742||New creation
|-
|Earl of Deloraine (1706)||Henry Scott, 1st Earl of Deloraine||1706||1730||New creation
|-
|Earl of Solway (1706)||Charles Douglas, 1st Earl of Solway||1706||1778||New creation
|-
|Earl of Ilay (1706)||Archibald Campbell, 1st Earl of Ilay||1706||1761||New creation
|-
|Viscount of Falkland (1620)||Lucius Henry Cary, 6th Viscount of Falkland||1694||1730||
|-
|Viscount of Dunbar (1620)||Robert Constable, 3rd Viscount of Dunbar||1668||1714||
|-
|Viscount of Stormont (1621)||David Murray, 5th Viscount of Stormont||1668||1731||
|-
|Viscount of Kenmure (1633)||William Gordon, 6th Viscount of Kenmure||1698||1715||
|-
|Viscount of Arbuthnott (1641)||Robert Arbuthnot, 4th Viscount of Arbuthnott||1694||1710||
|-
|Viscount of Oxfuird (1651)||Robert Makgill, 2nd Viscount of Oxfuird||1663||1706||Died, title dormant until 1977
|-
|Viscount of Kingston (1651)||Archibald Seton, 2nd Viscount of Kingston||1691||1713||
|-
|rowspan=2|Viscount of Irvine (1661)||Arthur Ingram, 3rd Viscount of Irvine||1668||1702||Died
|-
|Edward Machel Ingram, 4th Viscount of Irvine||1702||1714||
|-
|rowspan=2|Viscount of Kilsyth (1661)||James Livingston, 2nd Viscount of Kilsyth||1661||1706||Died
|-
|William Livingston, 3rd Viscount of Kilsyth||1706||1716||
|-
|Viscount Preston (1681)||Edward Graham, 2nd Viscount Preston||1695||1710||
|-
|Viscount of Newhaven (1681)||William Cheyne, 2nd Viscount Newhaven||1698||1728||
|-
|Viscount of Tarbat (1685)||George Mackenzie, 1st Viscount of Tarbat||1685||1714||Created Earl of Cromartie, see above
|-
|rowspan=2|Viscount of Strathallan (1686)||William Drummond, 2nd Viscount Strathallan||1688||1702||Died
|-
|William Drummond, 3rd Viscount Strathallan||1702||1711||
|-
|Viscount of Stair (1690)||John Dalrymple, 2nd Viscount of Stair||1695||1707||Created Earl of Stair, see above
|-
|Viscount of Teviot (1696)||Thomas Livingston, 1st Viscount Teviot||1696||1711||
|-
|Viscount Seafield (1698)||James Ogilvy, 1st Viscount Seafield||1698||1730||Created Earl of Seafield, see above
|-
|Viscount of Garnock (1703)||John Lindsay-Crawford, 1st Viscount of Garnock||1703||1708||New creation
|-
|rowspan=2|Viscount of Primrose (1703)||James Primrose, 1st Viscount of Primrose||1703||1706||New creation; died
|-
|Archibald Primrose, 2nd Viscount of Primrose||1706||1716||
|-
|Lord Somerville (1430)||James Somerville, 12th Lord Somerville||1693||1709||
|-
|Lord Forbes (1442)||William Forbes, 12th Lord Forbes||1697||1716||
|-
|Lord Saltoun (1445)||William Fraser, 12th Lord Saltoun||1693||1715||
|-
|Lord Gray (1445)||Patrick Gray, 8th Lord Gray||1663||1711||
|-
|Lord Sinclair (1449)||Henry St Clair, 10th Lord Sinclair||1676||1723||
|-
|Lord Oliphant (1455)||Charles Oliphant, 7th Lord Oliphant||1680||1709||
|-
|Lord Cathcart (1460)||Alan Cathcart, 6th Lord Cathcart||1628||1709||
|-
|Lord Lovat (1464)||Simon Fraser, 11th Lord Lovat||1699||1746||
|-
|Lord Sempill (1489)||Francis Sempill, 10th Lord Sempill||1695||1716||
|-
|Lord Ross (1499)||William Ross, 12th Lord Ross||1682||1738||
|-
|Lord Elphinstone (1509)||John Elphinstone, 8th Lord Elphinstone||1669||1718||
|-
|Lord Torphichen (1564)||James Sandilands, 7th Lord Torphichen||1696||1753||
|-
|rowspan=2|Lord Lindores (1600)||John Leslie, 4th Lord Lindores||1666||1706||Died
|-
|David Leslie, 5th Lord Lindores||1706||1719||
|-
|Lord Colville of Culross (1604)||Alexander Colville, 5th Lord Colville of Culross||1680||1717||
|-
|rowspan=2|Lord Balmerinoch (1606)||John Elphinstone, 3rd Lord Balmerino||1649||1704||Died
|-
|John Elphinstone, 4th Lord Balmerino||1704||1736||
|-
|rowspan=2|Lord Blantyre (1606)||Alexander Stuart, 5th Lord Blantyre||1670||1704||Died
|-
|Walter Stuart, 6th Lord Blantyre||1704||1713||
|-
|Lord Balfour of Burleigh (1607)||Robert Balfour, 4th Lord Balfour of Burleigh||1688||1713||
|-
|Lord Cranstoun (1609)||William Cranstoun, 5th Lord Cranstoun||1688||1727||
|-
|Lord Dingwall (1609)||James Butler, 3rd Lord Dingwall||1684||1715||
|-
|Lord Jedburgh (1622)||William Ker, 5th Lord Jedburgh||1692||1722||Succeeded to the Marquessate of Lothian, see above
|-
|Lord Aston of Forfar (1627)||Walter Aston, 3rd Lord Aston of Forfar||1678||1714||
|-
|Lord Fairfax of Cameron (1627)||Thomas Fairfax, 5th Lord Fairfax of Cameron||1688||1710||
|-
|rowspan=2|Lord Napier (1627)||Margaret Brisbane, 5th Lady Napier||1683||1706||Died
|-
|Francis Napier, 6th Lord Napier||1706||1773||
|-
|Lord Reay (1628)||George Mackay, 3rd Lord Reay||1681||1748||
|-
|rowspan=2|Lord Cramond (1628)||Henry Richardson, 3rd Lord Cramond||1674||1701||Died
|-
|William Richardson, 4th Lord Cramond||1701||1719||
|-
|Lord Forbes of Pitsligo (1633)||Alexander Forbes, 4th Lord Forbes of Pitsligo||1690||1746||
|-
|Lord Kirkcudbright (1633)||James Maclellan, 6th Lord Kirkcudbright||1678||1730||
|-
|Lord Fraser (1633)||Charles Fraser, 4th Lord Fraser||Abt 1680||1715||
|-
|rowspan=2|Lord Forrester (1633)||William Forrester, 4th Lord Forrester||1681||1705||Died
|-
|George Forrester, 5th Lord Forrester||1705||1727||
|-
|Lord Bargany (1641)||William Hamilton, 3rd Lord Bargany||1693||1712||
|-
|Lord Banff (1642)||George Ogilvy, 3rd Lord Banff||1668||1713||
|-
|Lord Elibank (1643)||Alexander Murray, 4th Lord Elibank||1687||1736||
|-
|Lord Falconer of Halkerton (1646)||David Falconer, 3rd Lord Falconer of Halkerton||1684||1724||
|-
|Lord Belhaven and Stenton (1647)||John Hamilton, 2nd Lord Belhaven and Stenton||1679||1708||
|-
|Lord Carmichael (1647)||John Carmichael, 2nd Lord Carmichael||1672||1710||Created Earl of Hyndford, see above
|-
|rowspan=2|Lord Duffus (1650)||James Sutherland, 2nd Lord Duffus||1674||1705||Died
|-
|Kenneth Sutherland, 3rd Lord Duffus||1705||1734||
|-
|rowspan=2|Lord Rollo (1651)||Andrew Rollo, 3rd Lord Rollo||1669||1700||Died
|-
|Robert Rollo, 4th Lord Rollo||1700||1758||
|-
|rowspan=2|Lord Ruthven of Freeland (1650)||David Ruthven, 2nd Lord Ruthven of Freeland||1673||1701||Died
|-
|Jean Ruthven, 3rd Lady Ruthven of Freeland||1701||1722||
|-
|Lord Rutherfurd (1661)||Robert Rutherfurd, 4th Lord Rutherfurd||1685||1724||
|-
|rowspan=2|Lord Bellenden (1661)||John Bellenden, 2nd Lord Bellenden||1671||1707||Died
|-
|John Bellenden, 3rd Lord Bellenden||1707||1741||
|-
|Lord Nairne (1681)||William Murray, 2nd Lord Nairne||1683||1716||
|-
|rowspan=2|Lord Kinnaird (1682)||Patrick Kinnaird, 2nd Lord Kinnaird||1689||1701||Died
|-
|Patrick Kinnaird, 3rd Lord Kinnaird||1701||1715||
|-
|Lord Glasford (1685)||Francis Abercromby, Lord Glasford||1685||1703||Died, title extinct
|-
|Lord Boyle of Kelburn, Stewartoun, Cumbrae, Finnick, Largs and Dalry (1699)||David Boyle, 1st Lord Boyle of Kelburn, Stewartoun, Cumbrae, Finnick, Largs and Dalry||1699||1733||Created Earl of Glasgow, see above
|-
|Lord Portmore and Blackness (1699)||David Colyear, 1st Lord Portmore and Blackness||1699||1730||Created Earl of Portmore, see above
|-
|}

Peerage of Ireland

|Duke of Ormonde (1661)||James Butler, 2nd Duke of Ormonde||1688||1715||
|-
|Duke of Leinster (1691)||Meinhard Schomberg, 1st Duke of Leinster||1691||1719||
|-
|Earl of Kildare (1316)||John FitzGerald, 18th Earl of Kildare||1664||1707||
|-
|Earl of Waterford (1446)||Charles Talbot, 12th Earl of Waterford||1667||1718||
|-
|Earl of Clanricarde (1543)||Richard Burke, 8th Earl of Clanricarde||1687||1708||
|-
|Earl of Thomond (1543)||Henry O'Brien, 8th Earl of Thomond||1691||1741||
|-
|rowspan=2|Earl of Castlehaven (1616)||James Tuchet, 5th Earl of Castlehaven||1686||1700||Died
|-
|James Tuchet, 6th Earl of Castlehaven||1700||1740||
|-
|rowspan=2|Earl of Cork (1620)||Charles Boyle, 3rd Earl of Cork||1698||1703||Died
|-
|Richard Boyle, 4th Earl of Cork||1703||1753||
|-
|Earl of Antrim (1620)||Randal MacDonnell, 4th Earl of Antrim||1699||1721||
|-
|Earl of Westmeath (1621)||Richard Nugent, 3rd Earl of Westmeath||1684||1714||
|-
|Earl of Roscommon (1622)||Robert Dillon, 6th Earl of Roscommon||1689||1715||
|-
|Earl of Londonderry (1622)||Robert Ridgeway, 4th Earl of Londonderry||1672||1714||
|-
|rowspan=2|Earl of Meath (1627)||Edward Brabazon, 4th Earl of Meath||1685||1707||Died
|-
|Chambre Brabazon, 5th Earl of Meath||1707||1715||
|-
|Earl of Barrymore (1628)||James Barry, 4th Earl of Barrymore||1699||1747||
|-
|Earl of Carbery (1628)||John Vaughan, 3rd Earl of Carbery||1687||1713||
|-
|Earl of Fingall (1628)||Peter Plunkett, 4th Earl of Fingall||1684||1718||
|-
|Earl of Desmond (1628)||Basil Feilding, 3rd Earl of Desmond||1685||1717||
|-
|rowspan=2|Earl of Donegall (1647)||Arthur Chichester, 3rd Earl of Donegall||1678||1706||Died
|-
|Arthur Chichester, 4th Earl of Donegall||1706||1757||
|-
|rowspan=2|Earl of Cavan (1647)||Charles Lambart, 3rd Earl of Cavan||1690||1702||Died
|-
|Richard Lambart, 4th Earl of Cavan||1702||1742||
|-
|rowspan=2|Earl of Inchiquin (1654)||William O'Brien, 2nd Earl of Inchiquin||1674||1692||Died
|-
|William O'Brien, 3rd Earl of Inchiquin||1692||1719||
|-
|rowspan=2|Earl of Orrery (1660)||Lionel Boyle, 3rd Earl of Orrery||1682||1703||Died
|-
|Charles Boyle, 4th Earl of Orrery||1703||1731||
|-
|Earl of Mountrath (1660)||Charles Coote, 3rd Earl of Mountrath||1672||1709||
|-
|Earl of Drogheda (1661)||Henry Hamilton-Moore, 3rd Earl of Drogheda||1679||1714||
|-
|rowspan=2|Earl of Carlingford (1661)||Francis Taaffe, 3rd Earl of Carlingford||1690||1704||Died
|-
|Theobald Taaffe, 4th Earl of Carlingford||1704||1738||
|-
|Earl of Mount Alexander (1661)||Hugh Montgomery, 2nd Earl of Mount Alexander||1663||1717||
|-
|Earl of Castlemaine (1661)||Roger Palmer, 1st Earl of Castlemaine||1661||1705||Died, title extinct
|-
|Earl of Tyrone (1673)||James Power, 3rd Earl of Tyrone||1693||1704||Died, title extinct
|-
|rowspan=2|Earl of Longford (1677)||Francis Aungier, 1st Earl of Longford||1677||1700||Died
|-
|Ambrose Aungier, 2nd Earl of Longford||1700||1706||Died, title extinct
|-
|Earl of Ranelagh (1677)||Richard Jones, 1st Earl of Ranelagh||1677||1711||
|-
|Earl of Granard (1684)||Arthur Forbes, 2nd Earl of Granard||1695||1734||
|-
|Earl of Limerick (1686)||Thomas Dongan, 2nd Earl of Limerick||1698||1715||
|-
|rowspan=2|Earl of Bellomont (1689)||Richard Coote, 1st Earl of Bellomont||1683||1701||Died
|-
|Nanfan Coote, 2nd Earl of Bellomont||1701||1708||
|-
|rowspan=2|Earl of Athlone (1692)||Godert de Ginkell, 1st Earl of Athlone||1692||1703||Died
|-
|Frederick Christian de Ginkell, 2nd Earl of Athlone||1703||1719||
|-
|Earl of Arran (1693)||Charles Butler, 1st Earl of Arran||1693||1758||
|-
|Earl of Galway (1697)||Henri de Massue, Earl of Galway||1697||1720||
|-
|rowspan=2|Viscount Mountgarret (1550)||Richard Butler, 5th Viscount Mountgarret||1679||1706||Died
|-
|Edmund Butler, 6th Viscount Mountgarret||1706||1735||
|-
|Viscount Grandison (1621)||John Villiers, 5th Viscount Grandison||1699||1766||
|-
|rowspan=2|Viscount Valentia (1622)||James Annesley, 4th Viscount Valentia||1690||1702||Died
|-
|John Annesley, 5th Viscount Valentia||1702||1710||
|-
|Viscount Dillon (1622)||Henry Dillon, 8th Viscount Dillon||1690||1713||
|-
|Viscount Loftus (1622)||Arthur Loftus, 3rd Viscount Loftus||1680||1725||
|-
|Viscount Beaumont of Swords (1622)||Thomas Beaumont, 3rd Viscount Beaumont of Swords||1658||1702||Died, title extinct
|-
|Viscount Netterville (1622)||John Netterville, 4th Viscount Netterville||1689||1727||
|-
|Viscount Kilmorey (1625)||Robert Needham, 7th Viscount Kilmorey||1687||1710||
|-
|Viscount Castleton (1627)||George Saunderson, 5th Viscount Castleton||1650||1714||
|-
|Viscount Mayo (1627)||Theobald Bourke, 6th Viscount Mayo||1681||1741||
|-
|Viscount Lumley (1628)||Richard Lumley, 2nd Viscount Lumley||1663||1721||
|-
|Viscount Molyneux (1628)||William Molyneux, 4th Viscount Molyneux||1699||1717||
|-
|Viscount Strangford (1628)||Philip Smythe, 2nd Viscount Strangford||1635||1708||
|-
|Viscount Scudamore (1628)||James Scudamore, 3rd Viscount Scudamore||1697||1716||
|-
|Viscount Wenman (1628)||Richard Wenman, 5th Viscount Wenman||1690||1728||
|-
|rowspan=2|Viscount FitzWilliam (1629)||Thomas FitzWilliam, 4th Viscount FitzWilliam||1670||1704||Died
|-
|Richard FitzWilliam, 5th Viscount FitzWilliam||1704||1743||
|-
|Viscount Fairfax of Emley (1629)||Charles Fairfax, 5th Viscount Fairfax of Emley||1651||1711||
|-
|Viscount Ikerrin (1629)||Pierce Butler, 4th Viscount Ikerrin||1688||1711||
|-
|Viscount Cullen (1642)||Charles Cokayne, 4th Viscount Cullen||1687||1716||
|-
|rowspan=2|Viscount Carrington (1643)||Francis Smith, 2nd Viscount Carrington||1665||1701||Died
|-
|Charles Smith, 3rd Viscount Carrington||1701||1706||Died, title extinct
|-
|Viscount Tracy (1643)||William Tracy, 4th Viscount Tracy||1687||1712||
|-
|rowspan=2|Viscount Bulkeley (1644)||Richard Bulkeley, 3rd Viscount Bulkeley||1688||1704||Died
|-
|Richard Bulkeley, 4th Viscount Bulkeley||1704||1724||
|-
|Viscount Barnewall (1646)||Nicholas Barnewall, 3rd Viscount Barnewall||1688||1725||
|-
|Viscount Massereene (1660)||Clotworthy Skeffington, 3rd Viscount Massereene||1695||1714||
|-
|Viscount Shannon (1660)||Richard Boyle, 2nd Viscount Shannon||1699||1740||
|-
|Viscount Fanshawe (1661)||Charles Fanshawe, 4th Viscount Fanshawe||1687||1710||
|-
|Viscount Cholmondeley (1661)||Hugh Cholmondeley, 2nd Viscount Cholmondeley||1681||1725||Created Earl of Cholmondeley, see above
|-
|Viscount Dungannon (1662)||Marcus Trevor, 3rd Viscount Dungannon||1693||1706||Died, title extinct
|-
||Viscount Fitzhardinge (1663)||John Berkeley, 4th Viscount Fitzhardinge||1690||1712||
|-
|Viscount Charlemont (1665)||William Caulfeild, 2nd Viscount Charlemont||1671||1726||
|-
|Viscount Powerscourt (1665)||Folliott Wingfield, 1st Viscount Powerscourt||1665||1717||
|-
|Viscount Blesington (1673)||Murrough Boyle, 1st Viscount Blesington||1673||1718||
|-
|Viscount Lanesborough (1676)||James Lane, 2nd Viscount Lanesborough||1683||1724||
|-
|Viscount Downe (1680)||Henry Dawnay, 2nd Viscount Downe||1695||1741||
|-
|rowspan=2|Viscount Rosse (1681)||Richard Parsons, 1st Viscount Rosse||1681||1703||Died
|-
|Richard Parsons, 2nd Viscount Rosse||1703||1741||
|-
|Viscount Mountjoy (1683)||William Stewart, 2nd Viscount Mountjoy||1692||1728||
|-
|Viscount Lisburne (1695)||John Vaughan, 1st Viscount Lisburne||1695||1721||
|-
|Viscount Windsor (1699)||Thomas Windsor, 1st Viscount Windsor||1699||1738||
|-
|Viscount Howe (1701)||Scrope Howe, 1st Viscount Howe||1701||1713||New creation
|-
|Viscount Fermanagh (1703)||John Verney, 1st Viscount Fermanagh||1703||1717||New creation
|-
|Viscount Doneraile (1703)||Arthur St Leger, 1st Viscount Doneraile||1703||1727||New creation
|-
|Viscount Mount Cashell (1706)||Paul Davys, 1st Viscount Mount Cashell||1706||1716||New creation
|-
|Baron Athenry (1172)||Edward Bermingham, 13th Baron Athenry||1677||1709||
|-
|Baron Kingsale (1223)||Almericus de Courcy, 23rd Baron Kingsale||1669||1720||
|-
|Baron Kerry (1223)||Thomas Fitzmaurice, 21st Baron Kerry||1697||1741||
|-
|Baron Howth (1425)||Thomas St Lawrence, 13th Baron Howth||1671||1727||
|-
|Baron Trimlestown (1461)||John Barnewall, 11th Baron Trimlestown||1692||1746||
|-
|Baron Dunsany (1462)||Randall Plunkett, 11th Baron of Dunsany||1690||1735||
|-
|rowspan=2|Baron Dunboyne (1541)||James Butler, 6th/16th Baron Dunboyne||1690||1701||Died
|-
|Pierce Butler, 7th/17th Baron Dunboyne||1701||1718||
|-
|rowspan=2|Baron Cahir (1583)||Theobald Butler, 5th Baron Cahir||1676||1700||Died
|-
|Thomas Butler, 6th Baron Cahir||1700||1744||
|-
|rowspan=2|Baron Hamilton (1617)||Charles Hamilton, 6th Baron Hamilton of Strabane||1692||1701||Died
|-
|James Hamilton, 7th Baron Hamilton of Strabane||1692||1701||
|-
|Baron Folliot (1620)||Henry Folliott, 3rd Baron Folliott||1697||1716||
|-
|Baron Maynard (1620)||Banastre Maynard, 3rd Baron Maynard||1699||1718||
|-
|Baron Gorges of Dundalk (1620)||Richard Gorges, 2nd Baron Gorges of Dundalk||1650||1712||
|-
|Baron Digby (1620)||William Digby, 5th Baron Digby||1685||1752||
|-
|Baron Fitzwilliam (1620)||William Fitzwilliam, 3rd Baron Fitzwilliam||1658||1719||
|-
|rowspan=2|Baron Blayney (1621)||William Blayney, 6th Baron Blayney||1689||1705||Died
|-
|Cadwallader Blayney, 7th Baron Blayney||1705||1732||
|-
|Baron Brereton (1624)||John Brereton, 4th Baron Brereton||1680||1718||
|-
|Baron Baltimore (1625)||Charles Calvert, 3rd Baron Baltimore||1675||1715||
|-
|Baron Coleraine (1625)||Henry Hare, 2nd Baron Coleraine||1667||1708||
|-
|rowspan=2|Baron Sherard (1627)||Bennet Sherard, 2nd Baron Sherard||1640||1700||
|-
|Bennet Sherard, 3rd Baron Sherard||1700||1732||
|-
|Baron Alington (1642)||Hildebrand Alington, 5th Baron Alington||1691||1723||
|-
|Baron Hawley (1646)||Francis Hawley, 2nd Baron Hawley||1684||1743||
|-
|Baron Kingston (1660)||John King, 3rd Baron Kingston||1693||1728||
|-
|Baron Barry of Santry (1661)||Henry Barry, 3rd Baron Barry of Santry||1694||1734||
|-
|rowspan=3|Baron Altham (1681)||James George Annesley, 2nd Baron Altham||1699||1700||Died
|-
|Richard Annesley, 3rd Baron Altham||1700||1701||Died
|-
|Arthur Annesley, 4th Baron Altham||1701||1728||
|-
|Baron Bellew of Duleek (1686)||Richard Bellew, 3rd Baron Bellew of Duleek||1694||1715||
|-
|Baron Shelburne (1688)||Elizabeth Petty, Baroness Shelburne||1688||1708||
|-
|Baron Cutts of Gowran (1690)||John Cutts, 1st Baron Cutts||1690||1707||Died, title extinct
|-
|Baron Coningsby (1692)||Thomas Coningsby, 1st Baron Coningsby||1692||1729||
|-
|Baron Shelburne (1699)||Henry Petty, 1st Baron Shelburne||1699||1751||
|-
|Baron Pierrepont (1702)||Gervase Pierrepont, 1st Baron Pierrepont||1702||1715||New creation
|-
|Baron Tyrawley (1706)||Charles O'Hara, 1st Baron Tyrawley||1706||1724||New creation
|-
|}

References

 

1700
1700s in England
1700s in Ireland
1700s in Scotland
Peers
Peers
Peers
Peers
Peers
Peers
18th-century nobility